Esfahlan (also Romanized as Esfahlān) is a village in Lahijan Rural District, Khosrowshahr District, Tabriz County, East Azerbaijan Province, Iran. At the 2016 census, its population was 4,939, in 1,587 families.

References 

Populated places in Tabriz County